The Institute of African Studies at University of Nigeria, Nsukka is a graduate research institution of African, peace and conflict resolution studies. It is an interdisciplinary center with previous directors of the institute coming from the fields of English, Fine Arts and History.

It was formerly known as Hansberry Institute, named after William Hansberry, an African American historian and scholar who was also a former teacher of Nnamdi Azikiwe, one time premier of the Eastern Region.

History 
The institute was established in 1963 as a research center for African culture and to also function as a repository of oral and documented African history. At inception, during a period following the country's independence, the institute acted as an initiative to promote understanding of African cultural identity and also scholarly cooperation within the African diaspora. Its first director was William Leo Hansberry, who served as director while abroad, he was succeeded in 1964 by Edward Blyden III and then Samuel Nwabara.

Between 1967 and 1970, Nigeria underwent a civil strife causing the institute to re-assess some of its goals. From 1970, the institute directed increased focus to the cultural identity of groups from the Southeastern region of Nigeria. In the early 1970s, it began publishing Ikenga and Ikorok, the former a scholarly journal on African studies and the latter, a bulletin of activities and research of the institute.

In 1982, a salvage project was initiated to record and document practices and norms of the Igbo speaking peoples of Southeastern Nigeria. This collection included traditional folklore, medical practices, food, clothing and oral history.

Facilities 

 Museum
 Library

Past directors 
 William Leo Hansberry
 Edward Blyden III
 Adiele Afigbo
 Uche Okeke
 Donatus Nwoga

References 

University of Nigeria
African studies
Research institutes in Nigeria
1963 establishments in Nigeria